This list includes sole survivors of aviation accidents and incidents that involved 10 or more onboard. Within this list, "sole survivor" refers to a person who survived an air accident in which all other aircraft occupants died as a direct consequence of the accident. This list does not include initial survivors who later died (possibly in another location) due to injuries sustained during the accident.

Notable examples

The earliest known sole survivor is Linda McDonald. On 5 September 1936, she survived a Skyways sightseeing plane crash near Pittsburgh that killed 9 other people, including her boyfriend. She was 17 at the time.

The youngest sole survivor is Chanayuth Nim-anong, who on 3 September 1997, survived a crash when he was just 14 months old. He was the sole survivor of Vietnam Airlines Flight 815, which had 65 deaths in total. The oldest sole survivor is Alexander Sizov, who was 52 years old when YAK-Service Flight 9633 crashed on 7 September 2011, with 44 fatalities.

Another sole survivor is a former Serbian flight attendant, Vesna Vulović. Some controversy arose in 2009 when her story was reported as possible communist propaganda, but flight recorder data strongly supported the official story.

Ben S. Cauley, Jr. was an American trumpet player, vocalist, songwriter, and founding member of the Stax recording group the Bar-Kays. He was the only survivor of the 1967 plane crash that claimed the lives of soul singer Otis Redding and four members of the Bar-Kays.

One of the more controversial lone survivors was Huang Yu (Hanyu Pinyin: Huáng Yù), who tried to hijack the Cathay Pacific aircraft Miss Macao in 1948, but ended up crashing the plane, killing the other 25 people on board.

The deadliest aviation disaster to have had a sole survivor was Northwest Airlines Flight 255, which crashed in Romulus, Michigan, on 16 August 1987, killing 154 of the 155 people on board the aircraft, as well as two people on the ground. The sole survivor of the crash was a 4-year-old girl named Cecelia Cichan, who was seriously injured.

List

Notes

Bibliography
 - Total pages: 193 
 - Total pages: 200 
 - Total pages: 15591

References

Lists of survivors